The 1998–99 Taça de Portugal was the 59th edition of the Portuguese football knockout tournament, organized by the Portuguese Football Federation (FPF). The 1998–99 Taça de Portugal began in September 1998. The final was played on 19 June 1999 at the Estádio Nacional.

Porto were the previous holders, having defeated Braga 3–1 in the previous season's final. Defending champions Porto were eliminated in the fifth round by third division side Torreense. Beira-Mar defeated Campomaiorense, 1–0 in the final to win their first Taça de Portugal. As a result of Beira-Mar winning the domestic cup competition, the Auri-negros faced 1998–99 Primeira Divisão winners Porto in the 1999 Supertaça Cândido de Oliveira.

Fourth round
All fourth round cup ties were played on 10 January. Ties which ended in a draw were replayed at a later date. The fourth round saw teams from the Primeira Liga (I) enter the competition.

|}

Replays

|}

Fifth round
Ties were played on 16 February. Due to the odd number of teams involved at this stage of the competition, Alverca qualified to the next round due to having no opponent to face at this stage of the competition.

Sixth round
Ties were played between the 7 March to the 8 April. Due to the odd number of teams involved at this stage of the competition, Torreense qualified for the quarter-finals due to having no opponent to face at this stage of the competition.

Quarter-finals
Ties were played on 11 April, whilst replays were played between the 21–28 April.

Semi-finals
Ties were played on 5 May.

Final

References

Taça de Portugal seasons
Taca De Portugal, 1998-99
1998–99 domestic association football cups